Below are the squads for the Football at the 1991 Mediterranean Games, hosted in Athens, Greece, and took place between 28 June and 12 July 1991. Teams were national Olympic sides.

Group A

Egypt

Italy

Turkey
Head coach:

Group B

Albania

Algeria
Head coach: Abdelmalek Laroui and Mourad Ouardi

Greece
Head coach:

Group C

San Marino

Tunisia

Yugoslavia

Group D

Cyprus

Morocco
Head coach:  Werner Olk

References

Sports at the 1991 Mediterranean Games
Mediterranean Games football squads